WATS may refer to:
 Wide Area Telephone Service, a phone service for U.S. telecommunications
 Wide Area Tracking System, a system for detecting ground-based nuclear weapons
 We Are the Strange, a 2007 independent animated film
 WATS (AM), a radio station (960 AM) licensed to Sayre, Pennsylvania, United States
Workshop for Armenian/Turkish Scholarship, a group of scholars exploring the Armenian Genocide

See also
Wat (disambiguation)
Watt (disambiguation)
Watts (disambiguation)
Vat (disambiguation)
Vats (disambiguation)